Woody Island may refer to:

Asia 
Woody Island, South China Sea

Australia 
 Mid Woody Islet, Tasmania, Australia
 Woody Island (Queensland), Australia
 Big Woody Island, Queensland, Australia
 Woody Islands (Big Woody Island and Little Woody Island, Queensland, Australia)
 Woody Island (Tasmania), Australia
 Woody Island (Western Australia)
 Woody Island, alternate name for Anderson Island (Tasmania), Australia

North America 
 Woody Island, Newfoundland and Labrador, near Garden Cove, Newfoundland and Labrador, Canada 
 Woody Island (Alaska), near Kodiak, Alaska, USA
 Woody Island (Montana), in Lake Bowdoin, Montana